Norbert Loch (born 11 March 1962) is a German former luger. He competed in the men's singles event at the 1984 Winter Olympics.

References

External links
 

1962 births
Living people
German male lugers
Olympic lugers of East Germany
Lugers at the 1984 Winter Olympics
People from Gotha (district)
Sportspeople from Thuringia